William Dale Owen (his middle name is given as "Dunn" in some references) (September 6, 1846 – date of death unknown) was a U.S. Representative from Indiana.  Before serving in Congress he was a clergyman, attorney, newspaper editor, and the author of two books.  After serving in Congress and as Secretary of State of Indiana, he engaged in various business ventures, including promotion of coffee and rubber plantations in Mexico.  In 1905 his business partner was arrested; in 1906 the partner was convicted of fraud and theft, and imprisoned.  Owen left the United States to avoid prosecution; what happened to him after he fled the country is not known.

Early life
Owen was born in Bloomington, Indiana, the son of William D. Owen and Priscilla (Rawlings) Owen.  He was educated in Bloomington, and began working as a store clerk at age 13 to save money so that he could attend college. He worked until age 18, including time as a farmhand and a brickyard laborer in addition to his work as a store clerk.  He attended Indiana University in Bloomington for over two years, and left before graduating so that he could begin to study law in the office of a local attorney.

Start of career
He quit the study of law when he was called to the ministry; he received his ordination in the Christian Church in 1870, and became pastor of congregations in Oxford, Indiana, Salem, Oregon, Tallula, Illinois, and Chicago, Illinois.  In 1878 he resumed the study of law, attained admission to the bar, and began to practice, first in Oxford, and later in Logansport.  In addition, Owen was a part-owner and editor of two weekly newspapers, the Logansport Saturday Night and the  Logansport Sunday Critic.

In 1880, Owen was a Republican candidate for presidential elector; his party carried Indiana, and he cast his ballot for the ticket of James A. Garfield and Chester A. Arthur.  Owen also published two well-received books, 1878's Success In Life, And How To Secure It, and 1883's The Genius Of Industry, Or How Work Wins and Manhood Grows.

Congressman
Owen was elected as a Republican to the Forty-ninth, Fiftieth, and Fifty-first Congresses (March 4, 1885 – March 3, 1891).  He was an unsuccessful candidate for reelection in 1890 to the Fifty-second Congress.

From July 1, 1891, to April 7, 1893, Owen served as the first superintendent of the United States Office of Immigration; he had been chairman of the House Committee on Immigration and Naturalization during his Congressional service, and played a lead role in passage of the legislation which created the agency.

Indiana Secretary of State
Owen was elected Secretary of State of Indiana in 1894 and served from January 17, 1895, to January 16, 1899.

Later life and career
After leaving office, Owen engaged in real estate speculation and invested in coffee and rubber plantations in Mexico.

In 1905, Owen and his business partner were indicted for fraud and theft in connection with the promotion of their Mexican plantations.  The partner was convicted and sentenced to prison.  Owen fled the United States to escape prosecution.  Individuals from Indiana later reported having seen Owen in Paris, Switzerland, and Egypt, but the sightings did not lead to his arrest.

An individual was arrested in Georgia in 1909 and accused of being Owen.  Investigators subsequently determined it to be a case of mistaken identity, and the individual who had been detained was released.

Owen's whereabouts after he fled the country, his date of death, and his burial location are not known.  There is a grave marker in his name at Mount Hope Cemetery in Logansport, the burial location of his first wife.

Family
In 1871, Owen married Mary Ross of Cincinnati, Ohio.  They had two children who died infancy; she died in December 1885.

In 1888, Owen married Lucy A. (Williams) Luce, a widow from Logan, Iowa.  They had met in Washington; during the 1888 Republican National Convention, Owen became ill and Luce nursed him until he was well.  The second Mrs. Owen died on a train in Arkansas on April 1, 1899, while returning with her husband from a visit to his Mexican plantations.  She was buried in her hometown of Logan, Iowa.

References

External links

1846 births
Secretaries of State of Indiana
Politicians from Bloomington, Indiana
19th-century American politicians
Year of death unknown
Republican Party members of the United States House of Representatives from Indiana